Randolph County School District the a school district on Randolph County, Alabama, headquartered in Wedowee.

Schools
K-12 schools:
 Wadley High School

7-12 schools:
 Woodland High School

Senior high schools:
 Randolph County High School

K-8 schools:
 Rock Mills Jr. High School

Middle schools:
 Wedowee Middle School

Elementary schools:
 Wedowee Elementary School
 Woodland Elementary School

Other:
 Randolph-Roanoke Career Technology Center

References

External links
 

Education in Randolph County, Alabama
School districts in Alabama